In May 2008, various weather forecast offices of the National Weather Service confirmed 462 tornadoes in the United States. At the time, this was the third most active May on record for tornado activity in the country, only behind 2003 and 2004. Based on the long-term 1991–2020 average, an average May records 268 tornadoes in the United States. The brunt of activity was focused across three significant events, including a tornado outbreak from May 1–2 and tornado outbreak sequences encompassing May 7–11 and May 22–27. The most intense tornado of the month was an EF5 tornado that affected areas near Parkersburg, Iowa. It was the first such tornado in Iowa since June 13, 1976. In all, tornado activity across the United States in May 2008 resulted in 44 deaths and 683 injuries. The monetary cost of the May 22–27 tornado activity alone cost $4.2 billion (2008 USD).

Daily statistics
There were 597 tornadoes reported in the United States in the month of May, of which 462 were confirmed.

List of confirmed tornadoes

May 1 event

May 2 event

May 3 event

May 5 event

May 6 event

May 7 event

May 8 event

May 9 event

May 10 event

May 11 event

May 13 event

May 14 event

May 15 event

May 17 event

May 18 event

May 20 event

May 22 to May 27 events

A total of 173 tornadoes were confirmed during this multi-day tornado outbreak. Three of the tornadoes touched down in Canada.

May 28 event

May 29 event

May 30 event

May 31 event

See also
 Tornadoes of 2008

Notes

References

Tornadoes
Natural disasters
Events in the United States